Salvador "Salva" Ruiz Rodríguez (born 17 May 1995) is a Spanish professional footballer who plays for CD Castellón as a left-back.

Club career
Born in Albal, Valencian Community, Ruiz was a product of Valencia CF's youth system. He made his senior debut with the reserves when he was only 16, playing 19 Segunda División B games in 2011–12 and scoring one goal, in the 2–0 home win against CE Manacor. He appeared in his first official match with the first team on 28 November 2012, featuring the full 90 minutes in a 3–1 home win over UE Llagostera for that season's Copa del Rey.

Ruiz was loaned out to CD Tenerife for the 2013–14 campaign. He made his first appearance in Segunda División on 25 August, starting and being replaced in a 0–0 home draw against Hércules CF.

On 13 July 2015, after a further two full seasons with Valencia B, Ruiz was loaned to Granada CF in a season-long deal. He made his debut in La Liga on 24 August, starting and being sent off in the 56th minute of an eventual 1–3 home loss to SD Eibar.

After being diagnosed with aplastic anemia, Ruiz was inactive for more than one year. On 10 January 2018, he signed a one-and-a-half-year contract with RCD Mallorca.

On 7 February 2019, Valencia activated their buy-back clause on Ruiz's contract; the player agreed a deal until June 2023, remaining on loan at Mallorca until the end of the campaign. On 2 September, however, he joined Deportivo de La Coruña of the second division for three years.

Club statistics

Honours
Spain U19
UEFA European Under-19 Championship: 2012

References

External links

CiberChe stats and bio 

1995 births
Living people
People from Horta Sud
Spanish footballers
Footballers from the Valencian Community
Association football defenders
La Liga players
Segunda División players
Segunda División B players
Primera Federación players
Valencia CF Mestalla footballers
Valencia CF players
CD Tenerife players
Granada CF footballers
RCD Mallorca players
Deportivo de La Coruña players
CD Castellón footballers
Spain youth international footballers